Nguyễn Quang Hải (born November 1, 1985) is a former Vietnamese footballer. He was a member of the Vietnam national football team.

Club career
He became famous after a successful national U-21 tournament in 2005 when he was the top scorer. At the 2008 V-League, he scored 10 goals.

Following the 2016 V.League 1, Quang Hải announced his retirement due to a long persisting back injury.

International career
Thanks to impressive performances in Khatoco Khánh Hòa and U.21 Khatoco Khánh Hòa in the 2007 season, Quang Hải was named in the Vietnam U23 team squad for the 2007 Southeast Asian Games. In the 2007 Southeast Asian Games, he was coached by Vietnam national football team coach Alfred Riedl at the time to remove the players from Nakhon Ratchasima, Thailand, where the 2007 Southeast Asian Games were held. He lost his last chance to join Vietnam U23 because he was 23 years old.

Quang Hải was chosen to play for Vietnam national football team to compete at 2008 AFF Suzuki Cup as he scored a last-minute goal against Singapore in the second leg of the semi-final to bring Vietnam into the final after received the assist from Lê Công Vinh. On May 14, 2009, he scored another late goal in a 1-0 win against Olympiacos F.C., then coached by Ernesto Valverde in an exhibition match, but it wasn't a FIFA match.

Honours

International
AFF Championship: 2008

International goals
Scores and results list Vietnam's goal tally first.

References

External links

1985 births
Living people
People from Khánh Hòa Province
Vietnamese footballers
Association football forwards
Than Quang Ninh FC players
Navibank Sài Gòn FC players
Vietnam international footballers